Ole ter Haar Romeny (born 20 June 2000) is a Dutch professional footballer who plays as a forward for Eredivisie club Emmen.

Club career

NEC
Romeny started playing football at age 8 at DVOL in Lent, before moving to the youth academy of NEC Nijmegen. In the winter of 2018, he was promoted to the first-team at training camp in Spanish Estepona. Under new first coach Pepijn Lijnders, he became a regular part of the squad. On 19 January 2018, he made his debut in a 2–3 away match against Almere City, replacing his childhood friend Ferdi Kadıoğlu in the 84th minute. In injury time, he had to leave the field after being sent off by referee Kevin Blom. With that, he became the youngest player ever in the Eerste Divisie who received a red card in his debut. The card was later dismissed after NEC filed a complaint and won the appeal.

Loan to Willem II
On 30 September 2020, Romeny signed for Eredivisie club Willem II on a season-long loan, with the option of a permanent transfer.

Emmen
On 27 January 2022, Romeny signed with Emmen for a 1.5-year term.

International career
Ter Haar Romeny played one international match for Netherlands national under-15 and under-18 team.

References

External links
 

2000 births
Living people
Dutch footballers
Footballers from Nijmegen
Association football forwards
Netherlands youth international footballers
Eredivisie players
Eerste Divisie players
NEC Nijmegen players
Willem II (football club) players
FC Emmen players